"You Can Do It" is a single by Ice Cube.

You Can Do It may also refer to:
 "You can do it!", a catchphrase used by actor Rob Schneider
 "You Can Do It" (No Doubt song)
 "You Can Do It", song by Linda Clifford from the album Linda
 "You can do it", a catchphrase by fitness and weight loss specialist Tony Little

See also
 We Can Do It (disambiguation)
 You Can Do That
 You Do It